The Zerdava (Georgian: მეკვერნე) is an aboriginal laika dog breed native to  Black Sea region of Turkey and Georgia. Zerdava are traditionally used as guard and hunting dog and are especially prized for boar hunting. The name “Zerdava” is Slavic for mustelid, possibly in reference to their Marten-brown color or their treeing behavior when hunting martens.

History
There exists very little written evidence on the origin of the Zerdava in Turkey and Georgia. The most probable is that hunting laika were acquired by trade from Russia as Baltic and Black Sea ports were the primary routes of Russian Fur trade into Europe and parts of Asia though the early Middle Ages. Zerdava have been documented in the Eastern Black Sea region for at least a hundred years in the Trabzon and Giresun provinces of Turkey.

Characteristics

Appearance
Zerdava are a spitz breed with a compact, athletic body, triangular, upright ears and a curved tail. They have a double coat that is always liver brown or a combination of liver brown and white.  The brown is described as marten-like in color, they may be solid liver or a combination of liver and white, such as liver and white-ticked except white tip of tail, piebald, ticked, or liver roan. At birth, the brown is often almost black in color and the white parts are without ticking. Zerdava will have brown noses and yellow-brown eyes. Their  sickle shaped tails are usually white tipped and any brown spots will be the same shade of brown as the rest of their body.

Behavior 
As is typical with laikas, zerdava are hardy and versatile hunters, capable of hunting game of a variety of sizes by treeing small game, stalking large prey silently until cornered, then working as teams to corner jackals, bear, and boar. They are especially prized for their ability to avoid injury while hunt boar, a major pest to corn farmers. Zerdava have had considerable success as search and rescue dogs.

They are devoted to their humans and distrust strangers, earning them the nickname “the Gate Dog” for their excellent capabilities as a watchdog. Puppies need considerable socialization with people to avoid overly shy or aggressive behavior. Zerdava often struggle with being rehomed and will try to escape and find their original owner.

Starting in 2016, Turkish Armed Force has training Zerdava for a variety of military uses including bomb and narcotic detection, search and rescue and personnel detention.

Health
Zerdava are prized for their excellent health in harsh conditions with minimal care. Like other laika, it is more common for the females to go into estrus only once a year. The population in Georgia is critically endangered due to frequent inbreeding and there are estimated to be 15-20 dogs left, with experts agreeing that the only way to stabilize the population is by importing dogs from Turkey.

References

Dog breeds originating in Turkey